Indigo is a deep color close to the color wheel blue (a primary color in the RGB color space), as well as to some variants of ultramarine, based on the ancient dye of the same name. The word "indigo" comes from the Latin word indicum, meaning "Indian", as the dye was originally exported to Europe from India.

It is traditionally regarded as a color in the visible spectrum, as well as one of the seven colors of the rainbow: the color between blue and violet; however, sources differ as to its actual position in the electromagnetic spectrum.

The first known recorded use of indigo as a color name in English was in 1289.

History 

Indigofera tinctoria and related species were cultivated in East Asia, Egypt, India, Bangladesh and Peru in antiquity. The earliest direct evidence for the use of indigo dates to around 4000 BC and comes from Huaca Prieta, in contemporary Peru. Pliny the Elder mentions India as the source of the dye after which it was named. It was imported from there in small quantities via the Silk Road.

Spanish explorers discovered an American species of indigo and began to cultivate the product in Guatemala. The English and French subsequently began to encourage indigo cultivation in their colonies in the West Indies.

In North America, indigo was introduced by Eliza Lucas into colonial South Carolina, where it became the colony's second-most important cash crop (after rice). Before the Revolutionary War, indigo accounted for more than one-third of the value of exports from the American colonies.

Blue dye can be made from two different types of plants: the indigo plant, which produces the best results, and from the woad plant Isatis tinctoria, also known as pastel. For a long time, woad was the main source of blue dye in Europe. Woad was replaced by true indigo as trade routes opened up, and both plant sources have now been largely replaced by synthetic dyes.

Classification as a spectral color 

The Early Modern English word indigo referred to the dye, not to the color (hue) itself, and indigo is not traditionally part of the basic color-naming system. Modern sources place indigo in the electromagnetic spectrum between 420 and 450 nanometers, which lies on the short-wave side of color wheel (RGB) blue, towards (spectral) violet.

The correspondence of this definition with colors of actual indigo dyes, though, is disputed. Optical scientists Hardy and Perrin list indigo as between 445 and 464 nm wavelength, which occupies a spectrum segment from roughly the color wheel (RGB) blue extending to the long-wave side, towards azure.

Isaac Newton introduced indigo as one of the seven base colors of his work. In the mid-1660s, when Newton bought a pair of prisms at a fair near Cambridge, the East India Company had begun importing indigo dye into England, supplanting the homegrown woad as source of blue dye. In a pivotal experiment in the history of optics, the young Newton shone a narrow beam of sunlight through a prism to produce a rainbow-like band of colors on the wall. In describing this optical spectrum, Newton acknowledged that the spectrum had a continuum of colors, but named seven: "The originall or primary colours are Red, yellow, Green, Blew, & a violet purple; together with Orang, Indico, & an indefinite varietie of intermediate gradations." He linked the seven prismatic colors to the seven notes of a western major scale, as shown in his color wheel, with orange and indigo as the semitones. Having decided upon seven colors, he asked a friend to repeatedly divide up the spectrum that was projected from the prism onto the wall:

I desired a friend to draw with a pencil lines cross the image, or pillar of colours, where every one of the seven aforenamed colours was most full and brisk, and also where he judged the truest confines of them to be, whilst I held the paper so, that the said image might fall within a certain compass marked on it. And this I did, partly because my own eyes are not very critical in distinguishing colours, partly because another, to whom I had not communicated my thoughts about this matter, could have nothing but his eyes to determine his fancy in making those marks.

Indigo is therefore counted as one of the traditional colors of the rainbow, the order of which is given by the mnemonics "Richard of York gave battle in vain" and Roy G. Biv. James Clerk Maxwell and Hermann von Helmholtz accepted indigo as an appropriate name for the color flanking violet in the spectrum.

Later scientists concluded that Newton named the colors differently from current usage.
According to Gary Waldman, "A careful reading of Newton's work indicates that the color he called indigo, we would normally call blue; his blue is then what we would name blue-green or cyan." If this is true, Newton's seven spectral colors would have been:

The human eye does not readily differentiate hues in the wavelengths between what are now called blue and violet. If this is where Newton meant indigo to lie, most individuals would have difficulty distinguishing indigo from its neighbors. According to Isaac Asimov, "It is customary to list indigo as a color lying between blue and violet, but it has never seemed to me that indigo is worth the dignity of being considered a separate color. To my eyes, it seems merely deep blue."

Modern color scientists typically divide the spectrum between violet and blue at about 450 nm, with no indigo.

Distinction among the four major tones of indigo 
Like many other colors (orange, rose, and violet are the best-known), indigo gets its name from an object in the natural world—the plant named indigo once used for dyeing cloth (see also Indigo dye).

The color "electric indigo" is a bright and saturated color between the traditional indigo and violet. This is the brightest color indigo that can be approximated on a computer screen; it is a color located between the (primary) blue and the color violet of the RGB color wheel.

The web color blue violet or deep indigo is a tone of indigo brighter than pigment indigo, but not as bright as electric indigo.

The color pigment indigo is equivalent to the web color indigo and approximates the color indigo that is usually reproduced in pigments and colored pencils.

The color of indigo dye is a different color from either spectrum indigo or pigment indigo. This is the actual color of the dye. A vat full of this dye is a darker color, approximating the web color midnight blue.

Below are displayed these four major tones of indigo.

Electric indigo 

"Electric indigo" is brighter than the pigment indigo reproduced below. When plotted on the CIE chromaticity diagram, this color is at 435 nanometers, in the middle of the portion of the spectrum traditionally considered indigo, i.e., between 450 and 420 nanometers. This color is only an approximation of spectral indigo, since actual spectral colors are outside the gamut of the sRGB color system.

Deep indigo (web color blue-violet) 

At right is displayed the web color "blue-violet", a color intermediate in brightness between electric indigo and pigment indigo. It is also known as "deep indigo".

Web color indigo 

The color box on the right displays the web color indigo, the color indigo as it would be reproduced by artists' paints as opposed to the brighter indigo above (electric indigo) that is possible to reproduce on a computer screen. Its hue is closer to violet than to indigo dye for which the color is named. Pigment indigo can be obtained by mixing 55% pigment cyan with about 45% pigment magenta.

Compare the subtractive colors to the additive colors in the two primary color charts in the article on primary colors to see the distinction between electric colors as reproducible from light on a computer screen (additive colors) and the pigment colors reproducible with pigments (subtractive colors); the additive colors are significantly brighter because they are produced from light instead of pigment.

Web color indigo represents the way the color indigo was always reproduced in pigments, paints, or colored pencils in the 1950s. By the 1970s, because of the advent of psychedelic art, artists became accustomed to brighter pigments. Pigments called "bright indigo" or "bright blue-violet" (the pigment equivalent of the electric indigo reproduced in the section above) became available in artists' pigments and colored pencils.

Tropical indigo 

'Tropical Indigo' is the color that is called añil in the Guía de coloraciones (Guide to colorations) by Rosa Gallego and
Juan Carlos Sanz, a color dictionary published in 2005 that is widely popular in the Hispanophone realm.

Indigo dye 

Indigo dye is a greenish dark blue color, obtained from either the leaves of the tropical Indigo plant (Indigofera), or from woad (Isatis tinctoria), or the Chinese indigo (Persicaria tinctoria). Many societies make use of the Indigofera plant for producing different shades of blue. Cloth that is repeatedly boiled in an indigo dye bath-solution (boiled and left to dry, boiled and left to dry, etc.), the blue pigment becomes darker on the cloth. After dyeing, the cloth is hung in the open air to dry.

A Native American woman described the process used by the Cherokee Indians when extracting the dye:
We raised our indigo which we cut in the morning while the dew was still on it; then we put it in a tub and soaked it overnight, and the next day we foamed it up by beating it with a gourd. We let it stand overnight again, and the next day rubbed tallow on our hands to kill the foam. Afterwards, we poured the water off, and the sediment left in the bottom we would pour into a pitcher or crock to let it get dry, and then we would put it into a poke made of cloth (i.e. sack made of coarse cloth) and then when we wanted any of it to dye [there]with, we would take the dry indigo.

In Sa Pa, Vietnam, the tropical Indigo (Indigo tinctoria) leaves are harvested and, while still fresh, placed inside a tub of room-temperature to lukewarm water where they are left to sit for 3 to 4 days and allowed to ferment, until the water turns green. Afterwards, crushed limestone (pickling lime) is added to the water, at which time the water with the leaves are vigorously agitated for 15 to 20 minutes, until the water turns blue. The blue pigment settles as sediment at the bottom of the tub. The sediment is scooped out and stored. When dyeing cloth, the pigment is then boiled in a vat of water; the cloth (usually made from yarns of hemp) is inserted into the vat for absorbing the dye. After hanging out to dry, the boiling process is repeated as often as needed to produce a darker color.

Imperial blue

In nature

Birds

 Male indigobirds are a very dark, metallic blue.
 The indigo bunting, native to North America, is mostly bright cerulean blue with an indigo head. 
 The related blue grosbeak is, ironically, more indigo than the indigo bunting.

Fungi

 Lactarius indigo is one of the very few species of mushrooms colored in tones of blue.

Snakes

 The eastern indigo snake, Drymarchon couperi, of the southeastern United States, is a dark blue/black.

In culture

Business 
 IndiGo is an Indian budget airline that uses an indigo logo and operates only Airbus A320s.
 Indigo Books and Music uses an indigo logo and has sometimes referred to the color as "blue" in advertising.
 The GameCube was initially released in 2 color variants, including one bearing the title of 'Indigo', with the main console and controllers in that color.

Computer graphics 
 Electric indigo is sometimes used as a glow color for computer graphics lighting, possibly because it seems to change color from indigo to lavender when blended with white.

Dyes 

 Indigo dye was used to dye denim, giving the original 'blue jeans' their distinctive colour.
 The original Postal Worker uniform contained indigo dye, partly due to the dye not running when wet. 
Guatemala, as of 1778, was considered one of the world's foremost providers of indigo.
 In Mexico, indigo is known as añil. After silver, and cochineal to produce red, añil was the most important product exported by historical Mexico. 
 The use of añil is survived in the Philippines, particularly in the Visayas and Mindanao. The powder dye is mixed with vinegar to be applied to the cheek of a person suffering from mumps.

Food 
 Scientists discovered in 2008 that when a banana becomes ripe, it glows bright indigo under a black light. Some insects, as well as birds, see into the ultraviolet, because they are tetrachromats and can use this information to tell when a banana is ready to eat. The glow is the result of a chemical created as the green chlorophyll in the peel breaks down.

Literature 
Marina Warner's novel Indigo (1992) is a retelling of Shakespeare's The Tempest and features the production of indigo dye by Sycorax.

Military 
The French Army adopted dark blue indigo at the time of the French Revolution, as a replacement for the white uniforms previously worn by the Royal infantry regiments. In 1806, Napoleon decided to restore the white coats because of shortages of indigo dye imposed by the British continental blockade. However, the greater practicability of the blue color led to its retention, and indigo remained the dominant color of French military coats until 1914.

Popular culture 
In the Better Call Saul episode "Hero", Howard Hamlin mentions that his law firm Hamlin Hamlin & McGill trademarked a colour called "Hamlindigo" whilst confronting Jimmy McGill over trademark infringement in a billboard advertisement he produced for his own legal services.

Spirituality 
The spiritualist applications use electric indigo, because the color is positioned between blue and violet on the spectrum.
 The color electric indigo is used in New Age philosophy to symbolically represent the sixth chakra (called Ajna), which is said to include the third eye. This chakra is believed to be related to intuition and gnosis (spiritual knowledge).
 Alice A. Bailey used indigo as the "second ray", representing "Love-Wisdom", in her Seven Rays system classifying people into seven metaphysical psychological types.
 Psychics often associate indigo paranormal auras with an interest in religion or with intense spirituality and intuition. Indigo children are said to have predominantly indigo auras. People with indigo auras are said to favor occupations such as computer analyst, animal caretaker, and counselor.
In Wicca, it represents emotion, fluidity, insight, and expressiveness. It is used to spiritually heal.

See also 
 Baptisia (false indigo), a genus of flowering plants
 Indigo dye, used in dyeing blue jeans their characteristic color
 Indigofera, a genus of flowering plants
 Lists of colors
 Persicaria tinctoria, Japanese Indigo
 Red, White, and Black Make Blue: Indigo in the Fabric of Colonial South Carolina Life by Andrea Feeser

References

External links 

Tertiary colors
Quaternary colors
Optical spectrum
Rainbow colors
Shades of blue